According to the National Incident Management System (NIMS), the Incident Base is one of five predesignated temporary facilities and it is the location at which primary support activities are conducted for emergencies like a wildland fire. A single incident base is established to house all equipment and personnel support operations. The Logistics Section, which orders all resources and supplies, is also located at this base. The Incident Base should be designed to be able to support operations at multiple incident sites.

See also

NIMS Predesignated Facilities and Areas
 Incident Command Post (ICP)
 Incident Base  
 Camp, or fire camp
 Mobilization and staging area
 Helibase and supporting Helispot and Drop Point

References
NIMS 3.04

Incident management